Peptoniphilus urinimassiliensis is a bacterium from the genus of Peptoniphilus which has been isolated from human urine.

References 

Bacteria described in 2017
Eubacteriales